Jia-Jen Lin (Chinese: 林嘉貞; pinyin: Lín Jiājen) is a Taiwanese-American visual artist based in New York City and Taichung. Her work spans several media, including sculpture, video, photography, and collaborative performance. Lin uses her artwork as a way to investigate the human body in its role as an experiential interface for the mind and experience.

See also
Taiwanese art

External links
 Artist's website
 Jia-Jen Lin at International Studio & Curatorial Program (ISCP)
 Jia-Jen Lin at Perth Institute of Contemporary Arts (PICA), in Perth, Australia
 Jia-Jen Lin at Sculpture Space
 Jia-Jen Lin Vimeo channel
 Jia-Jen Lin Instagram
 Jia-Jen Lin Facebook Page

References

Living people
Taiwanese women artists
American women artists
American installation artists
Year of birth missing (living people)
21st-century American women